Flores Magón is a Mexican surname.

People with the surname Flores Magón include the trio of Mexican anarchist brothers:
 Ricardo Flores Magón (1874–1922)
 Jesús Flores Magón (1871–1930)
 Enrique Flores Magón (1877-1954)

Surnames
Spanish-language surnames

es:Flores Magón